The Bombardier HR-412, also known as the MLW HR-412, was a 4 axle,  freight locomotive manufactured in Montreal, Quebec, Canada. Ten were built for Canadian National Railway in between September and November 1981, numbered 2580–2589, and one was built for Bombardier as a demonstrator in May 1982, numbered BBD 7000.  BBD 7000 was later sold to Canadian National.

The model designation stood for HR - High Reliability, 412 - 4 axles, 12 cylinder engine.  The HR-412 was designed as the successor to the MLW M-420.

See also 
 List of MLW diesel locomotives

References

 

HR-412
HR-412
B-B locomotives
Railway locomotives introduced in 1981
Diesel-electric locomotives of Canada
Canadian National Railway locomotives
Scrapped locomotives
Standard gauge locomotives of Canada
Freight locomotives